Miss Nobody is a 1926 silent film drama produced and distributed by First National Pictures and directed by Lambert Hillyer. The film is based on a short story by Tiffany Wells called "Shebo"; the likely feminine pronunciation of hobo. The stars of the film were Anna Q. Nilsson and Walter Pidgeon, then in a very early role in his career. The plot of this film bears a striking resemblance to Beggars of Life, made two years later at Paramount.

Synopsis
The father of an heiress dies broke leaving her destitute without inheritance. She falls in with a group of hobos traveling incognito cross country dressed as a man.

Cast
Anna Q. Nilsson - Barbara Brown
Walter Pidgeon - Bravo
Louise Fazenda - Mazie Raleigh
Mitchell Lewis - Harmony
Clyde Cook - Bertie
Arthur Stone - Happy
Anders Randolf - J.B. Hardiman
Claire Du Brey - Ann Adams
Jed Prouty - The Farmer
Caroline Rankin - His Wife
George Nichols - The Sheriff
Elita Proctor Otis - Miriam Arnold (billed as Oleta Otis)
James Gordon - Police Sergeant
Fred Warren - Barker

Preservation status
This film appears to now be a lost film. Two other silent films titled Miss Nobody from 1917 (starring Gladys Hulette) and 1920 (starring Billie Rhodes) are preserved in the film collection of the Library of Congress.

References

External links
Miss Nobody at IMDB
Miss Nobody at SilentEra
Miss Nobody at AllMovie
Anna Q. Nilsson in a still from Photoplay magazine (July 1926)
lobby poster for Miss Nobody

1926 films
Lost American films
1926 drama films
American silent feature films
American black-and-white films
Cross-dressing in American films
Films directed by Lambert Hillyer
First National Pictures films
Rail transport films
Silent American drama films
1926 lost films
Lost drama films
1920s American films